David F. Myers (July 18, 1938 – November 11, 2011) was a Republican politician from the U.S. state of Oklahoma. He was a member of the Oklahoma Senate, representing an electoral district that includes Alfalfa, Garfield, Grant, Kay, and Noble counties.

Myers retired from ConocoPhillips in Ponca City, where he worked as a chemical engineer in the oil refining industry for 33 years. Until his death, he worked as an independent consultant for the oil industry.

Political career
Myers was elected to the Oklahoma Senate on November 5, 2002, beating both Democratic Party candidate Tom Leonard and independent candidate Den Coates. Myers received 11,010 votes.

Myers was among the supporters of a tort reform bill in 2007. He was the 2008 author of a bill to expand a smoking ban to all public places.

Myers first served as the vice chair of the powerful Senate Appropriations Committee before serving as chair of the committee in 2011.  He died of pneumonia on November 11, 2011.

References

Republican Party Oklahoma state senators
Deaths from pneumonia in Oklahoma
1938 births
2011 deaths
21st-century American politicians